Tanya Trotter is an American actress, author and musician.

Early life and education
Blount was educated at Morgan State University, where she majored in psychology and sang in the university choir. She has a son named Antonio.

Career
Blount first came to prominence in the film, Sister Act 2: Back in the Habit (1993) in which she featured as the character "Tanya". Her performance of "His Eye is on the Sparrow" with Lauryn Hill was a particularly notable moment. MadameNoire commented, 'she and R&B/Hip-hop musician Lauryn Hill captivated audiences with a memorable performance'. Blount also appeared on the feature film's original soundtrack album.

Her debut album, Natural Thing, was released in 1994 and peaked at number 58 on the US R&B/Hip-Hop Albums chart. The album's first single "I'm Gonna Make You Mine" peaked at number 57 on the USR&B/Hip-Hop Songs chart. "Through the Rain" followed, peaking at number 27 on US R&B/Hip-Hop Songs and became her first appearance on the US Hot 100 where it peaked at number 90. Third single, "Hold On" peaked at number 66 on the US R&B/Hip-Hop Songs chart. In 1994, Blount released a holiday single titled "Remember Love". In 1995, Blount received a nomination for Best New Artist at the Soul Train Awards.

In 1996, Blount signed to Sean Combs' Bad Boy Entertainment and commenced the recording of her second album; writing for herself and other Bad Boy artists. Though Combs was involved in the project initially, interest in the album 'flagged'. Though years passed, only 2 songs; "I Love Him" and "The Last Time We Made Love", were released. According to EBONY, Blount was included on the label's first gospel LP alongside artists; B.I.G., Faith Evans, Brandy, Carl Thomas, John P. Kee, Brian McKnight, Boyz II Men and Total. Commenting on the album, Blount explained "“I think Puffy is looking for a different way to go; he feels a responsibility to the Big Willies and hustlers to understand. A lot of people from the streets have a strong background in church. Maybe it’s time to send the message that they can party and still love Jesus.” Originally scheduled for release in 1997, the album was shelved indefinitely. In February 2000, the Washington Post reported Blount was pursuing a release from her contract with Bad Boy Entertainment and negotiating a settlement.

Blount has had a consistent musical theatre career in productions including What Every Woman Wants, Sneaky, Preacher's Kids, Born to Sing! and Christmas in Washington.
In 2008, Blount's song "Right Here", was featured in the 2008 Tyler Perry film, The Family That Preys.

In 2016, Blount released the duet album Love Affair with her husband, Michael Trotter Jr., as Trotter and Blount. The duo also released the single "Hi Ho" that year as The War and Treaty. "Hi Ho" was described by Paste writer Chris Estey as 'the break out soul hit'. In 2017, The War and Treaty released the EP Down to the River, described as a mix of 'blues, gospel, soul, bluegrass, country' and heralded by Estey as 'a splendidly made immediate classic about conflict and redemption'. In 2018, Rolling Stone reported The War and Treaty's debut album Healing Tide is due for release on August 10, 2018, describing the lead single as a 'joyfully relentless title track, reminiscent of classic Ike and Tina Turner rock-infused soul'. On September 25, 2020, The War and Treaty released their sophomore album, Hearts Town, on Rounder Records.

Discography

Studio albums

Live albums

Extended plays

Singles
as lead artist

as featured artist

as The War and Treaty

Album appearances

Soundtrack appearances

Writing credits

Filmography
Sister Act 2: Back in the Habit (1993) - Tanya

Published works
Through the Rain 40 Principles for Surviving Life's Challenges

Awards
1995: nominee, Soul Train Music Award, Best New Artist
2019: winner, Americana Music Award for Emerging Artist of the Year (with The War and Treaty)

Notes

References

External links

Tanya Blount on Myspace
The War and Treaty Official website

Year of birth missing (living people)
Living people
African-American actresses
20th-century American actresses
20th-century African-American women singers
American contemporary R&B singers
American sopranos
Morgan State University alumni
20th-century American women singers
21st-century American women singers
American soul singers
American gospel singers
21st-century American singers
20th-century American singers
21st-century African-American women